Dad in Training (original title: Tout pour être heureux) is a 2015 French comedy film written and directed by Cyril Gelblat, loosely based on the novel Un coup à prendre by Xavier de Moulins. The film stars Manu Payet, Audrey Lamy and Aure Atika.

Cast 
 Manu Payet as Antoine
 Audrey Lamy as Alice
 Aure Atika as Judith
 Pascal Demolon as Étienne
 Bruno Clairefond as Bébert
 Joe Bel as Angélique
 Rafaèle Gelblat as Rafèle
 Vanessa Guide as Eva
 Jaïa Caltagirone as Leonor 
 Antoine de Caunes as himself
 Sophie Cattani as The mediator
 Alexis Michalik as Guillaume
 Anne Benoît (Scenes deleted)

Accolades

References

External links 
 

2015 films
2015 comedy films
2010s French-language films
French comedy films
Films based on French novels
2010s French films